Kaskaskia River State Fish and Wildlife Area is an Illinois state park on  in St. Clair, Monroe, and Randolph Counties, Illinois, United States.  A focus of this conservation area is Baldwin Lake, a perched cooling pond managed by the Illinois Department of Natural Resources for fishing.

References

State parks of Illinois
Protected areas of Randolph County, Illinois
Protected areas of St. Clair County, Illinois
Protected areas of Monroe County, Illinois